The 2023 Billie Jean King Cup qualifying round will be held from 14 to 15 April 2023. The nine winners of this round will qualify for the 2023 Finals while the nine losers will play at the 2023 Play-offs.

Teams
Eighteen teams will play for nine spots in the Finals, in series decided on a home and away basis.

These eighteen teams are:
 10 teams ranked 3rd–12th in the 2022 Finals
 8 winning teams from the 2022 Play-offs

The nine winning teams from the qualifying round will play at the 2023 Finals and the nine losing teams will play at the 2023 Play-offs.

#: Nations Ranking as of 16 November 2022.

Qualified teams

Seeded teams
  (#3)
  (#4)
  (#5)
  (#6)
  (#7)
  (#8)
  (#9)
  (#10)
  (#12)

Unseeded teams
  (#13)
  (#14)
  (#15)
  (#16)
  (#17)
  (#20)
  (#22)
  (#30)
  (#34)

Results summary

Results

Spain vs. Mexico 

Team nominations: 
: Nuria Párrizas Díaz, Rebeka Masarova, Sara Sorribes Tormo, Marina Bassols Ribera, Aliona Bolsova 
: Fernanda Contreras Gómez, Marcela Zacarías, Renata Zarazúa, Giuliana Olmos

Ukraine vs. Czech Republic 

Team nominations: 
: Marta Kostyuk, Dayana Yastremska, Katarina Zavatska, Lyudmyla Kichenok 
: Barbora Krejčíková, Kateřina Siniaková, Linda Nosková, Karolína Muchová, Markéta Vondroušová

Great Britain vs. France 

Team nominations: 
: Harriet Dart, Heather Watson, Katie Boulter, Alicia Barnett, Olivia Nicholls 
: Caroline Garcia, Alizé Cornet, Clara Burel, Kristina Mladenovic

Canada vs. Belgium 

Team nominations: 
: Bianca Andreescu, Leylah Fernandez, Rebecca Marino, Gabriela Dabrowski 
: Ysaline Bonaventure, Greet Minnen, Yanina Wickmayer, Kirsten Flipkens

United States vs. Austria 

Team nominations: 
: Jessica Pegula, Coco Gauff, Madison Keys, Danielle Collins, Caty McNally 
: Julia Grabher, Sinja Kraus, Barbara Haas, Tamira Paszek, Melanie Klaffner

Slovakia vs. Italy 

Team nominations: 
: Anna Karolína Schmiedlová, Viktória Kužmová, Renáta Jamrichová, Tereza Mihalíková 
: Martina Trevisan, Camila Giorgi, Elisabetta Cocciaretto, Jasmine Paolini, Lucia Bronzetti

Germany vs. Brazil 

Team nominations: 
: Tatjana Maria, Jule Niemeier, Anna-Lena Friedsam, Eva Lys, Laura Siegemund 
: Beatriz Haddad Maia, Laura Pigossi, Carolina Alves, Ingrid Gamarra Martins, Luisa Stefani

Kazakhstan vs. Poland 

Team nominations: 
: Elena Rybakina, Yulia Putintseva, Gozal Ainitdinova, Anna Danilina, Zhanel Rustemova 
: Iga Świątek, Magda Linette, Magdalena Fręch, Weronika Falkowska, Alicja Rosolska

Slovenia vs. Romania 

Team nominations: 
: Tamara Zidanšek, Kaja Juvan, Nina Potočnik, Pia Lovrič, Ela Nala Milić 
: Ana Bogdan, Irina Bara, Jaqueline Cristian, Anca Todoni, Monica Niculescu

References

External links
Draw

Qualifying Round
Billie Jean King Cup
Billie Jean King Cup
Billie Jean King Cup